MSB may refer to:

 Main Support Battalion, part of the U.S. Army logistics
 Maritime Services Board, former government agency in New South Wales, Australia
 Marshall Swift-Boeckh, a cost estimation services provider and subsidiary of CoreLogic
 Le Mans Sarthe Basket a French basketball team
 The Magic School Bus, series of children's books about science
 Media Stream Broadcast, a proprietary, multicast communications protocol owned by Microsoft
 1,4-Bis(2-methylstyryl) benzene, also known as p-Bis(o-methylstyryl) benzene and abbreviated Bis-MSB, a wavelength shifting compound used in liquid scintillators
 Microsoft Surface Book
 Bureau of Investigation and Statistics (Military Investigation and Statistics Bureau), the military intelligence agency of the Republic of China before 1946.
 Millennium Seed Bank, an international conservation project for storing plant seeds
 Molecular Systems Biology, an open-access, peer-reviewed scientific journal
 Money services business, a legal term used by financial regulators to describe businesses that transmit or convert money
 Most significant bit, the bit with the highest significance in a word
 Most significant byte, the highest byte in a multi-byte number
 Mrs. Stewart's Bluing, a brand of fabric bluing agent that whitens fabrics with a dye called Prussian blue (ferric hexacyanoferrate)
 Myanmar Standard Bible, a translation of the Bible into the Burmese language
 Myndigheten för samhällsskydd och beredskap, the Swedish Civil Contingencies Agency
 MSB, the Southern Railway station code for Chennai Beach railway station, Chennai, Tamil Nadu, India

Educational institutions
 Marriott School of Business at Brigham Young University
 Mason School of Business at the College of William & Mary
 McDonough School of Business at Georgetown University
 Mediterranean School of Business, is the first Business School of South Mediterranean University (SMU) in Tunisia
 Michigan School for the Blind
 Minnesota School of Business & Globe University
 Mississippi School for the Blind
 Missouri School for the Blind, Saint Louis (established 1851)
 MSB Educational Institute, a world-wide network of Islamic schools.

Music
 Melbourne Staff Band, the premier brass band of the Salvation Army in Australia
 Michael Stanley Band, a heartland rock band from Cleveland, Ohio, USA
 MSB (album), a 1982 studio album by Michael Stanley de  Devendra rajput

Video games
 Mario Slam Basketball, a 2006 video game for the Nintendo DS; aka Mario Hoops 3-on-3
 Mario Superstar Baseball, a 2005 video game for the Nintendo GameCube